Uulbayan (Mountain rich) is a sum (district) of Sükhbaatar Province in eastern Mongolia. In 2009, its population was 2,883.

References 

Districts of Sükhbaatar Province